The 2020 FC Okzhetpes season was the club's second season back in the Kazakhstan Premier League following their relegation at the end of the 2017 season, and 29th season in total.

Season events
On 13 March, the Football Federation of Kazakhstan announced all league fixtures would be played behind closed doors for the foreseeable future due to the COVID-19 pandemic. On 16 March the Football Federation of Kazakhstan suspended all football until 15 April.

On 30 May, the Professional Football League of Kazakhstan announced that Irtysh Pavlodar had withdrawn from the league due to financial issues, with all their matches being excluded from the league results.

On 26 July, it was announced that the league would resume on 1 July, with no fans being permitted to watch the games. The league was suspended for a second time on 3 July, for an initial two weeks, due to an increase in COVID-19 cases in the country.

Contracts
On 13 January, Okzhetpes extended the contracts with Milan Stojanović, Darko Zorić, Plamen Dimov and Artjom Dmitrijev until the end of the 2020 season.

On 14 January, Okzhetpes extended the contracts with goalkeepers Ruslan Abzhanov and Yaroslav Baginsky until the end of the 2020 season.

On 27 January, Okzhetpes extended the contracts with Sanat Zhumakhanov, Ilya Kalinin and Altynbek Saparov until the end of the 2020 season.

Squad

Transfers

In

Released

Friendlies

Competitions

Premier League

Results summary

Results by round

Results

League table

Kazakhstan Cup

Squad statistics

Appearances and goals

|-
|colspan="14"|Players away from Okzhetpes on loan:
|-
|colspan="14"|Players who left Okzhetpes during the season:

|}

Goal scorers

Clean sheet

Disciplinary record

References

FC Okzhetpes seasons
Okzhetpes